Dan-Ștefan Montreanu  (born 11 September 1970 in Orăștie, Hunedoara County, Socialist Republic of Romania) is a Romanian politician, who had been the Romanian Minister for Agriculture in the first Tăriceanu cabinet (which was led by former PNL president Călin Popescu-Tăriceanu) between 2006 and 2007.

Since 2019 onwards, he has also been a PNL member of the European Parliament for Romania, seating with the EPP group.

References

1970 births
Living people
MEPs for Romania 2019–2024
National Liberal Party (Romania) MEPs
Romanian Ministers of Agriculture
People from Orăștie